Jewett Presbyterian Church Complex is a historic Presbyterian church on Church Street in Jewett, Greene County, New York.  The complex consists of the 1848 Jewett Presbyterian Church and adjacent 1848 former Methodist Episcopal Church.  The Jewett Presbyterian Church is a two-story, four by three bay timber-framed building sheathed in clapboard and topped by a gable roof.  The former Methodist Episcopal Church was built using a one-story, four by three bay plan and features a moderately pitched gable roof.  Both structures feature Greek Revival design elements.

It was added to the National Register of Historic Places in 2001.

References

Presbyterian churches in New York (state)
Churches on the National Register of Historic Places in New York (state)
Churches completed in 1848
19th-century Presbyterian church buildings in the United States
Churches in Greene County, New York
National Register of Historic Places in Greene County, New York
1848 establishments in New York (state)